Dedicated to You is a 1961 album by Ray Charles. Originally released in January 1961 the album collects Charles' musical love notes to twelve very special women, by name.

A 1998 Rhino Records re-issue combined, on a single CD, Dedicated to You and Ray Charles and Betty Carter.

Track listing
 "Hardhearted Hannah" (Jack Yellen, Milton Ager, Charles Bates, Bob Bigelow) – 3:14
 "Nancy (With the Laughing Face)" (Phil Silvers, Jimmy Van Heusen) – 3:02 
 "Margie" (Con Conrad, J. Russel Robinson, Benny Davis) – 2:44
 "Ruby" (Mitchell Parish, Heinz Roemheld) – 3:51 
 "Rosetta" (Earl Hines, Henri Woode) – 2:29
 "Stella by Starlight" (Ned Washington, Victor Young) – 3:47
 "Cherry" (Ray Gilbert, Don Redman) – 3:37
 "Josephine" (Burke Bivens, Kahn, Wayne King) – 2:14
 "Candy" (Mack David, Alex Kramer, Joan Whitney) – 4:09
 "Marie" (Irving Berlin) – 2:21
 "Diane" (Lew Pollack, Erno Rapee) – 3:51
 "Sweet Georgia Brown" (Ben Bernie, Kenneth Casey, Maceo Pinkard) – 2:30

Personnel
Betty Carter – vocals, performer
Ray Charles – piano, keyboards, vocals 
Marty Paich - arrangements, conductor

References/External links
ABC 355
[ Album summaries at Allmusic.com]
 Album summaries at warr.org

1962 albums
Ray Charles albums
ABC Records albums
Albums conducted by Marty Paich
Albums arranged by Marty Paich
Albums produced by Ray Charles